Stableford is a scoring system used in the sport of golf.

Stableford may also refer to:
 Brian Stableford (born 1948), British science fiction writer
 Howard Stableford (born 1959), British television and radio presenter

See also
 Competition Stableford Adjustment, a scoring system in golf
 Stapleford (disambiguation)